Statistics of the Primera División de México for the 1972–73 season.

Overview

Atlas was promoted to Primera División.

It was contested by 18 teams, and Cruz Azul won the championship.

Pachuca was relegated to Segunda División.

Teams

Group stage

Group 1

Group 2

Results

Relegation playoff

Bracket

Semifinal

Aggregate tied. 3rd match will be played.

Laguna won 4-1 on aggregate.

Torreón won 3-1 on aggregate.

Relegation Final

Aggregate tied. A replay will be played

Zacatepec won 1-0 in aggregate. Pachuca was relegated to Segunda Division.

Championship playoff

Bracket

Semifinal

Cruz Azul won 4-2 on aggregate.

Aggregate tied. 3rd match will be played.

Aggregate 4-4. León won in penalties 6-5.

Final

Aggregate 1-1. 3rd match will be played.

Cruz Azul won 3-2 on aggregate.

References
Mexico - List of final tables (RSSSF)

Liga MX seasons
Mex
1972–73 in Mexican football